Viana may refer to:

Places
Viana, Luanda, Angola
Viana, Espírito Santo, Brazil
Viana, Maranhão, Brazil
Viana do Castelo, Portugal
Viana, Spain in Navarre
Viana (comarca), Ourense, Galicia, Spain
Viana do Bolo, a municipality in the comarca

Other uses
Vianna, alternate spelling
Viana (department store), a Mexican discount chain
Viana (gastropod), a genus of land snails
Esporte Clube Viana, a Brazilian football club based in Maranhão state
 (1885–1914), Brazilian parasitologist honored on a Brazilian postage stamp
Hugo Viana (born 1983),  Portuguese footballer

See also
Prince of Viana

Portuguese-language surnames